Minorka Marisela Mercado Carrero (born January 15, 1972  in Caracas, Venezuela) is Miss Venezuela 1993. She won the Miss Photogenic, Best in Swimsuit, Best in Maria Clara gown awards and placed second runner-up to Miss Universe 1994.

Pageantry

Miss Venezuela
Minorka competed in 1993 as Miss Apure in her country's national beauty pageant, Miss Venezuela, capturing the crown and the right to represent her country in Miss Universe 1994, where she finished as 2nd runner up.

Miss Universe
As the official representative of her country to the 1994 Miss Universe pageant held in Manila, Philippines on May 20, 1994, she won three special awards: Best in Swimsuit, Best in Filipino Costume and Miss Photogenic. In the end, she placed second runner-up to Miss Universe 1994.

References

External links
Miss Venezuela Official Website
Miss Universe Official Website

1972 births
Living people
Miss Universe 1994 contestants
Miss Venezuela winners
People from Caracas
Venezuelan women's volleyball players